{{Infobox noble
|name         = George Manners, 11th Baron Ros of Helmsley
|image        = Arms of Manners, Baron de Ros.svg 
|image_size   = 200px
|caption      = Arms of Manners (unaugmented): Or, two bars azure a chief gules, as visible impaling St Leger in a window of the Rutland Chantry, St George's Chapel, Windsor Castle. The later chief quarterly azure and gules; in the 1st and 4th quarters two fleurs-de-lis and in the 2nd and 3rd a lion passant guardant all or was granted as an augmentation by King Henry VIII to his son Thomas Manners, 1st Earl of Rutland at the time of his creation as Earl of Rutland, in recognition of his descent in the maternal line from King Edward III.<ref>(Via Richard Plantagenet, 3rd Duke of York) The general armory of England, Scotland, Ireland, and Wales, Comprising a Registry of Armorial Bearings from the Earliest to the Present Time by Sir Bernard Burke, 1884 edition, p. 656</ref>
|noble family = 
|birth_date   = c. 1470
|birth_place  = 
|death_date   = 27 October 1513
|death_place  = 
|burial_place = 
|spouse       = Anne St Leger
|issue        = Thomas Manners, 1st Earl of RutlandOliver MannersAnthony MannersSir Richard MannersJohn MannersAnne MannersEleanor MannersElizabeth MannersKatherine MannersCecily MannersMargaret Manners
|father       = Sir Robert Manners
|mother       = Eleanor Ros
|}}

George Manners, 11th Baron de Ros of Helmsley (c. 147027 October 1513) was an English peer.

Family
George Manners, born about 1470, was the son of Sir Robert Manners (d. 1495) of Etal, Northumberland, and Eleanor de Ros or Roos (d. 1487), eldest daughter of Thomas de Ros, 9th Baron de Ros (9 September 1427 – 17 May 1464), and Philippa Tiptoft (c. 1423 – after 30 January 1487), daughter of John Tiptoft, 1st Baron Tiptoft and Powis. He had a brother and two sisters:

Edward Manners.
Elizabeth Manners, who married Sir William Fairfax (d. 11 May 1514) of Steeton, Yorkshire, Justice of the Common Pleas, son and heir of Sir Guy Fairfax of Steeton, Chief Justice of Lancaster, by Margaret, daughter of Sir William Ryther. A descendant of this marriage was the Parliamentary commander, Thomas Fairfax, who on 20 June 1637 married Anne Vere, daughter of Horace Vere, 1st Baron Vere of Tilbury, and Mary Tracy. Their daughter, Mary Fairfax, married George Villiers, 2nd Duke of Buckingham, whose mother, Katherine, was the daughter of Francis Manners, 6th Earl of Rutland.
Cecily Manners, who married Thomas Fairfax.

Career
Manners was enrolled at Lincoln's Inn on 12 May 1490. In 1508, he was coheir to his uncle, Edmund de Ros, 10th Baron de Ros. In 1492, it had been determined that Edmund de Ros was unable to administer his own affairs, and he was placed in the custody of his brother-in-law, Sir Thomas Lovell, husband of Manners' aunt, Isabel Lovell. Edmund de Ros died on 23 October 1508, and was buried in the parish church at Elsing in Enfield, Middlesex. In about 1509, Manners was the sole heir to his aunt, Isabel Lovell.

Manners was with Thomas Howard, then Earl of Surrey, in the Scottish campaign of 1497, and was knighted by him on or before 30 September of that year. He was in attendance in 1500 when King Henry VII met Archduke Philip near Calais. In November 1501, he was among those who received Catherine of Aragon at St. George's Field. He was nominated to the Order of the Garter on 27 April 1510, although not elected.

In 1513, Manners campaigned in France. He was a commander at the siege of Thérouanne, and was present at the siege of Tournai. He fell ill about the time Tournai surrendered on 23 September 1513.

Manners died on 27 October 1513, either in France or at Holywell in Shoreditch. He may have been first buried at Holywell, and his body later removed to St George's Chapel, Windsor Castle. His effigy is in the Rutland Chapel. His widow, Anne, died on 21 April 1526, and was buried at St. George's, Windsor.

Manners owned a medieval manuscript copy of a chanson de geste, Les Voeux du Paon'' (The Vows of the Peacock), by Jacques de Longuyon, which is now Spencer Collection MS 009 in the New York Public Library. Manners wrote his name on a flyleaf of the manuscript, folio i verso, which may be viewed online.

Marriage and issue
Manners married, about 1490, Anne St Leger (c. 1475/6 – 21 April 1526), daughter and heiress of Thomas St. Leger by Anne of York, Duchess of Exeter, the second child and eldest surviving daughter of Richard of York, 3rd Duke of York, and Cecily Neville (1415–1495), daughter of Ralph Neville, 1st Earl of Westmorland. Anne of York was the elder sister of King Edward IV; Edmund, Earl of Rutland; Elizabeth of York, Duchess of Suffolk; Margaret of York, Duchess of Burgundy; George Plantagenet, 1st Duke of Clarence and King Richard III.

George Manners and Anne St Leger had five sons and six daughters:

Thomas Manners, 1st Earl of Rutland, who married Eleanor Paston, credited with saying to Anne of Cleves, 'Madam there must be more to it than that, or it will be long before we have a Duke of York which all this realm much desireth'. Their son, Henry Manners, 2nd Earl of Rutland, married Margaret Neville, daughter of Ralph Neville, 4th Earl of Westmorland by Katherine Stafford.
Oliver Manners.
Anthony Manners.
Sir Richard Manners.
John Manners.
Anne Manners, who married Sir Henry Capell.
Eleanor Manners, who married John Bourchier, 2nd Earl of Bath.
Elizabeth Manners, who married Thomas Sandys, 2nd Baron Sandys.
Katherine Manners, also known as Catherine Manners (c. 1510–c. 1547), who married Sir Robert Constable.
Cecily Manners.
Margaret Manners, who married firstly, Sir Henry Strangeways, and secondly, Robert Heneage.

Monument
His monument, consisting of a grand chest tomb with sculpted effigies of himself and his wife, survives in the Rutland Chantry (formerly the St Leger Chantry, founded by his father-in-law Sir Thomas St Leger) forming the north transept of St George's Chapel, Windsor Castle. The base of the monument and the stained glass windows display much heraldry of the Manners and St Leger families.

Footnotes

References

External links
 Images from manuscript of Les Voeux du Paon owned by George Manners, New York Public Library
 Description of Manners copy of Les Voeux du Paon at Digital Scriptorium

1470 births
1513 deaths
Year of birth uncertain
11
G
Burials at St George's Chapel, Windsor Castle
15th-century English people
16th-century English nobility